Mill Creek flows into the Black River in Watson, New York.

References 

Geography of Lewis County, New York
Lake Ontario
Lewis County, New York
Tributaries of Lake Ontario